The fauna of the United States of America is all the animals living in the Continental United States and its surrounding seas and islands, the Hawaiian Archipelago, Alaska in the Arctic, and several island-territories in the Pacific and in the Caribbean. The U.S. has many endemic species found nowhere else on Earth. With most of the North American continent, the U.S. lies in the Nearctic, Neotropic, and Oceanic faunistic realms, and shares a great deal of its flora and fauna with the rest of the American supercontinent.

An estimated 432 species of mammals characterize the fauna of the continental U.S. There are more than 800 species of bird and more than 100,000 known species of insects. There are 311 known reptiles, 295 amphibians and 1154 known fish species in the U.S. Known animals that exist in all of the lower 48 states include white-tailed deer, bobcat, raccoon, muskrat, striped skunk, barn owl, American mink, American beaver, North American river otter and red fox. The red-tailed hawk is one of the most widely distributed hawks not only in the U.S., but in the Americas.

Huge parts of the country with the most distinctive indigenous wildlife are protected as national parks. In 2013, the U.S. had more than 6770 national parks or protected areas, all together more than 1,006,619 sq. miles (2,607,131 km2). The first national park was Yellowstone National Park in the state of Wyoming, established in 1872. Yellowstone National Park is widely considered to be the finest megafauna wildlife habitat in the U.S. There are 67 species of mammals in the park, including the gray wolf, the threatened lynx, and the grizzly bear.

Western United States 

The ecoregions and ecology found in the Western United States are extremely varied. For instance, large areas of land are made up of everything from sand dunes in the Central Basin and Range ecoregion, which makes up much of the State of Nevada, to the ecology of the North Cascades in Washington state, which has the largest concentration of active alpine glaciers in the lower 48. The densely forested areas found in Northern California, Oregon, Washington, Idaho, and Montana have mostly species adapted to living in temperate climates, while Southern California, Nevada, Arizona, southern Utah, and New Mexico have a fauna resembling its position in the dry deserts with temperature extremes.

The western continental coast of the U.S., just as the East Coast, varies from a colder-to-warmer climate from north to south. Few species live throughout the entire West Coast, however, there are some, including the bald eagle that inhabits both the Alaskan Aleutian Islands and the California Channel Islands. In most of the contiguous Western U.S. are mule deer, white-tailed antelope squirrels, cougars, American badgers, coyotes, hawks and several species of snakes and lizards are common.

While the American black bear lives throughout the U.S., the brown bears and grizzly bears are more common in the northwest and in Alaska. Along the West Coast there are several species of whales, sea otters, California sea lions, eared seals and northern elephant seals. In the dry, inland desert areas of states such as California, Nevada, Arizona and New Mexico there are some of the world's most venomous lizards, snakes and scorpions. The most notorious might be the Gila monster and Mohave rattlesnake, both found in deserts in the Southwest. The Sonoran Desert has eleven species of rattlesnakes - more than anywhere else in the world.

Along the southwestern border there are jaguars and ocelots. Other mammals include the Virginia opossum, which occurs throughout California and coastal areas in Oregon and Washington. The North American beaver and mountain beaver live in forested areas of Washington, Oregon and Northern California. The kit fox lives throughout Arizona, New Mexico and Utah, while the gray fox occurs throughout the Western U.S.

The red fox occurs mostly in Oregon and Washington, while the island fox is a native to six of the eight Channel Islands in Southern California. These islands are also famous for their marine life and endemic species such as the Channel Islands spotted skunk, Garibaldi, island fence lizard, island scrub jay, bald eagle, and their non-native Catalina Island bison herd. The raccoon and spotted skunk occur throughout the Western U.S., while the ring-tailed cat occurs throughout Arizona, New Mexico, Western Texas, Utah, Colorado, and most of California. The American black bear occurs in most western states, including Washington, Oregon, California, Arizona and Colorado.

Channel Islands 

The Channel Islands National Park consists of five out of the eight California Channel Islands. The Channel Islands are part of one of the richest marine biospheres of the world. Many unique species of plants and animals are endemic to the Channel Islands, including fauna such as the island fox, Channel Islands spotted skunk, island scrub jay, ashy storm-petrel, island fence lizard, island night lizard, Channel Islands slender salamander, Santa Cruz sheep, San Clemente loggerhead shrike and San Clemente sage sparrow. Other animals in the islands include the California sea lion, California moray, bald eagle, Channel Islands spotted skunk and the non-native Catalina Island bison herd.

Southern United States 

The South has a large variety of habitats that range from the Mississippi River basin in Arkansas and Mississippi to the Southern  Appalachian Mountains. As far north as the hills of Tennessee and Virginia, all the way down to the Everglades in the southern end of Florida. From the eastern-most point on the Outer Banks of North Carolina, as far west as the deserts and prairies of West Texas and Oklahoma. The warmer climate allows for rich biodiversity ranging from cypress swamps in Louisiana to the thick bays and the longleaf pine biome of the South Carolina Lowcountry. It is riddled along the way with countless salt marshes in every coastal state from the Carolinas, through Georgia to Texas, including the Mobile Delta that lies in the borders of Alabama. 

The Southern United States is home to a multitude of reptiles and amphibians. 
The American alligator lives in much of the South - including every coastal state from North Carolina to Texas, along with the inland states of Arkansas and Tennessee- while the less widespread American crocodile is only found in southern Florida. The Alligator snapping turtle and more than forty other species of turtle are found in the southern U.S. including the eastern box turtle, red-eared slider, and the softshell turtle. Snakes in the region include the eastern copperhead, eastern diamondback rattlesnake, timber rattlesnake, pigmy rattlesnake, cottonmouth, and eastern coral snake, all of which are venomous. Some of the other reptiles and amphibians thriving in the South include the Carolina anole, razor-backed musk turtle, broad-headed skink, American bullfrog, southern toad, spring peeper and the coal skink.

Mammals of the region include the elk, the largest of which that was wiped out in the 1800s, but has been reintroduced and is making promising recoveries in Virginia, North Carolina, Tennessee, and Arkansas. There still remain resident populations in parts of Texas and Oklahoma. The American black bear is native to much of the South, but are prevalent in Virginia, the Carolinas, Tennessee, Georgia, Florida, Arkansas, and Oklahoma. The Florida panther is the largest feline in the South and is exclusive to the wetlands of South Florida. White-tailed deer, bobcat, coyote, wild boar, red and grey fox are other mammals that inhabit parts of every state in the region. Wild horses roam parts of the South in small groups, which are remnants of horses brought by settlers in the 1400s and 1500s. These are mostly in coastal habitats.

Many water-dwelling mammals inhabit the South including the American beaver, muskrat, river otter, and nutria, which is an invasive species and has decimated plant life in the swamps of Louisiana. Weasels and mink also prefer being near water. Rabbits are common in the South; the eastern cottontail is found throughout the region, while the desert cottontail and black-tailed jackrabbit is primarily found in Texas, and Oklahoma. The swamp rabbit is found in wetlands of states like Mississippi, Alabama, Louisiana and Arkansas, while the marsh rabbit resides along the coastal regions of the Carolinas, Georgia, Florida, and Alabama. Squirrels are also abundant. The eastern grey squirrel and eastern fox squirrel can both be found in every southern state. The southern range of the American red squirrel dips into the higher elevations of Virginia and North Carolina. Other common mammals are the Virginia opossum, raccoon striped and spotted skunk, groundhog and in parts of the South, the nine-banded armadillo.

There are over 1,100 species of bird in the Southern U.S. ranging from upland birds, to waterfowl. The South is home to many coastal birds including gulls, rails, gallinules, skimmers, grebes, sandpipers, cranes, and herons. Upland birds include wild turkey and ruffed grouse. Various game bird species such as the bobwhite quail and the woodcock. The eastern whip-poor-will and the Chuck-will's-widow belong to the nighthawk family and are found in  every southern state. Songbirds make up the largest portion of birds found in this region.

Central United States 

In the prairie in the Central United States lives mostly animals adapted for living in grasslands. Indigenous mammals include the American bison, eastern cottontail, black-tailed jackrabbit, plains coyote, black-tailed prairie dog, muskrat, opossum, raccoon, prairie chicken, wild turkey, white-tailed deer, swift foxes, pronghorn antelope, the Franklin's ground squirrel and several other species of ground squirrels.

Reptiles include bullsnakes, common collared lizard, common snapping turtle, musk turtles, yellow mud turtle, painted turtle, western diamondback rattlesnake and the prairie rattlesnake. Some of the typical amphibians found in the region are the three-toed amphiuma, green toad, Oklahoma salamander, lesser siren and the plains spadefoot toad. In the Rocky Mountains and other mountainous areas of the inland is where the bald eagle is most observed, even though its habitat includes all of the Lower 48, as well as Alaska.

Rabbits live throughout the Great Plains and neighboring areas; the black-tailed jackrabbit is found in Texas, Oklahoma, Nebraska and Kansas, the white-tailed jackrabbit in the Dakotas, Minnesota and Wisconsin, the swamp rabbit in swampland in Texas, and the eastern cottontail is found in Texas, Oklahoma, Kansas, Nebraska, the Dakotas, and every state in the Eastern U.S.

The groundhog is widespread throughout Illinois, Iowa, Missouri, and Minnesota. Virginia opossum is found is states such as Missouri, Indiana, Iowa, Oklahoma, Nebraska and Kansas.

The nine-banded armadillo is found throughout the South and states such as Missouri, Kansas and Oklahoma. The muskrat is found throughout the Central U.S., excluding Texas, while the American beaver is found in every central state.

Maybe the most iconic animal of the American prairie, the American buffalo, once roamed throughout the central plains. Bison once covered the Great Plains and were critically important to Native-American societies in the Central U.S. They became nearly extinct in the 19th century, but have made a recent resurgence in the Great Plains. Today, bison numbers have rebounded to about 200,000; these bison live on preserves and ranches.

Some of the species that occupy every central state include the red fox, bobcat, white-tailed deer, raccoon, eastern spotted skunk, striped skunk, long-tailed weasel, and the American badger and beaver. The wild boar is common in the South, while the American mink lives in every central state with the exception of Texas. The least weasel is found around the Great Lakes as well as states such as Nebraska, the Dakotas, Minnesota, Iowa, Illinois, Michigan, and Wisconsin.

The gray fox is found in Iowa, Missouri, Oklahoma, Texas and also around the Great Lakes region. The ring-tailed cat is found in the southern region, including in Texas, Missouri, and Oklahoma. There are many species of squirrels in the central parts of the U.S., including the fox squirrel, eastern gray squirrel, Franklin's ground squirrel, southern flying squirrel, and the thirteen-lined ground squirrel. Voles include the prairie vole, woodland vole and the meadow vole. The plains pocket gopher lives throughout the Great Plains. Shrews include the cinereus shrew, southeastern shrew, North American least shrew, and the Elliot's short-tailed shrew.

Eastern United States 

In the Appalachian Mountains and the Eastern United States are many animals that live in forested habitats. They include deer, rabbits, rodents, squirrels, hares, woodpeckers, owls, foxes and bears. The New England region is particularly famous for its crab and the American lobster living along most of the Atlantic Coast. The bobcat, raccoon and striped skunk live in every eastern state, while the American alligator lives in every coastal state between North Carolina and Texas.

Some species of mammals found throughout the Eastern U.S. includes the red fox and gray fox, the North American beaver, North American porcupine, Virginia opossum, eastern mole, coyote, white-tailed deer, American mink, North American river otter, and long-tailed weasel. The American black bear lives throughout most of New England, New York, New Jersey, Pennsylvania, Maryland, the Virginias, and parts of the Carolinas and Florida.

Shrews are common: the cinereus shrew, long-tailed shrew and American water shrew are widespread in the New England region, while the North American least shrew and southeastern shrew are common in the southeastern states. The American pygmy shrew, smoky shrew, and northern short-tailed shrew are found from the Appalachian Mountains to New England. The star-nosed mole lives throughout the Eastern U.S., while the hairy-tailed mole is more common from the Appalachians to New England in the north.

Hares are also common: the snowshoe hare thrives from the Appalachians to New England, the Appalachian cottontail is only found in the Appalachians, the New England cottontail is only found in New England, while the eastern cottontail is widespread throughout the east. While the white-footed mouse and muskrat are common throughout the east, with the exception of Florida, the meadow vole is found from the Appalachians to New England and the southern red-backed vole is found in New England.

The brown rat and the house mouse were both introduced and their habitat range throughout the Eastern U.S. Weasels such as the fisher and short-tailed weasel are found in the northeast. The eastern chipmunk, fox squirrel, eastern gray squirrel and the woodchuck are found throughout the region, while the southern flying squirrel and northern flying squirrel are more common in the southeast, the American red squirrel is more common in the northeast. The least weasel is native to the Appalachian Mountains.

The wild boar is the wild ancestor of the domestic pig and has spread through much of the southeastern region as an invasive species. The Canada lynx is found in parts of New England. Species of bats found throughout the east includes the eastern pipistrelle, silver-haired bat, eastern red bat, hoary bat, big brown bat, little brown bat, northern long-eared myotis, and in most regions the eastern small-footed myotis, gray bat and Indiana bat.

Of the marine life, the harbor seal is the most widely distributed species of seal and found along the east coast, while the hooded seal, bearded seal, grey seal, ringed seal, and harp seal are found in the northwest. Whales are common along Atlantic coastline. Whale species found along the entire coastline includes the Gervais' beaked whale, common minke whale, fin whale, sei whale, blue whale, humpback whale, sperm whale, dwarf sperm whale, pygmy sperm whale, killer whale, Cuvier's beaked whale, True's beaked whale, and the Blainville's beaked whale.

The northern bottlenose whale and the long-finned pilot whale are also common along the New England coast. Dolphins are common; species found along the entire coastline includes the Risso's dolphin, short-beaked common dolphin, striped dolphin, Atlantic spotted dolphin and the common bottlenose dolphin. Dolphin species found in New England include white-beaked dolphin and Atlantic white-sided dolphin, while species roaming the southeastern parts of the coastline include the Fraser's dolphin, pantropical spotted dolphin, Clymene dolphin, spinner dolphin, and the rough-toothed dolphin.

Several sea turtles live along the Atlantic coast, including the hawksbill sea turtle, Kemp's ridley sea turtle, and loggerhead sea turtle. The green sea turtle and leatherback sea turtle are more common species along the southeastern coastline. Land turtles and tortoises found throughout most of the Eastern United States are the common snapping turtle, painted turtle, spotted turtle, diamondback terrapin, spiny softshell turtle, eastern mud turtle, northern red-bellied cooter, common musk turtle, eastern box turtle, and the yellow- and red-eared slider. While common species in the northeast include Blanding's turtle, wood turtle, and bog turtle, common species in the southeastern U.S. include gopher tortoise, pond slider, Escambia map turtle, Barbour's map turtle, eastern river cooter, striped mud turtle, loggerhead musk turtle, and the Florida softshell turtle. The smooth softshell turtle is for instance found in the Ohio River and the Allegheny River in Pennsylvania.

Some of the snake species found in much of the Eastern U.S. includes the eastern racer, De Kay's snake, northern copperhead, ringneck snake, timber rattlesnake, eastern hog-nosed snake, milk snake, northern water snake, western rat snake, northern redbelly snake, plainbelly water snake, midland water snake, scarlet kingsnake, common kingsnake, queen snake, smooth earth snake, ribbon snake, and the common garter snake. Snake species mostly found in the northeast includes the smooth green snake, northern ribbon snake, and the eastern worm snake.

Snakes limited to the southeast includes the southeastern crown snake, pinesnake, eastern diamondback rattlesnake, coral snake, pygmy rattlesnake, southern copperhead, water moccasin, eastern coral snake, eastern indigo snake, southern hognose snake, coachwhip snake, banded water snake, brown water snake, green water snake, Nerodia clarkii clarkii, salt marsh snake, mole kingsnake, pine woods snake, glossy crayfish snake, striped crayfish snake, short-tailed snake, swamp snake, rim rock crown snake, rough earth snake, southern black racer, rough green snake, western rat snake, eel moccasin, and the mud and corn snakes. The eastern fence lizard is common throughout the Eastern United States, with the exception of New York and New England.

The gray wolf once roamed the Eastern U.S., but is now extinct from this region. The eastern cougar as well was once as widespread as the cougar in the western parts of the country, but was deemed extinct by the U.S. Fish and Wildlife Service in 2011. Eastern elk once lived throughout the east, but was extirpated in the 19th century and declared as extinct by the U.S. Fish and Wildlife Service in 1880. Moose as well once roamed throughout the east, but is currently only found in northern New England. Due to its highly prized fur, the sea mink was hunted to extinction in 1903.

Hawaiian Islands 

Much of the fauna in Hawaii has developed special adaptations to their home and evolved into new species. Today, nearly 90% percent of the fauna in Hawaii are endemic, meaning that they exist nowhere else on Earth. Kauaʻi is home to the largest number of tropical birds, as it is the only island free of mongooses. The Javan mongoose is widespread throughout the archipelago, except on the islands of Lanaʻi and Kauaʻi.

Famous birds include ʻiʻiwi, nukupuʻu, Kauaʻi ʻamakihi and ʻōʻū. Unfortunaly, most of these birds and now extinct.  The hoary bat is found in the Kōkeʻe State Park on Kauaʻi, wild horses live in the Waipio Valley, wild cattle by the Mauna Kea and the Australian brush-tailed rock-wallaby live by the Kalihi Valley on Oʻahu. The Hawaiian monk seal, wild goats, sheep and pigs live throughout most of the archipelago.

In Hawaii, three species of sea turtles are considered native: honu, honu’ea and the leatherback sea turtle. Two other species, the loggerhead sea turtle and the olive ridley sea turtle, are sometimes observed in Hawaiian waters. The Hawaiian green sea turtle is the most common sea turtle in Hawaiian waters. As well as turtles, the sea life consist of more than forty species of shark and the Hawaiian spinner dolphin is widespread. Hawaii's coral reefs are home to over 5000 species, and 25 percent of these are found nowhere else in the world.

Alaska 

The wildlife of Alaska is abundant, extremely diverse and includes for instance polar bears, puffins, moose, bald eagles, Arctic foxes, wolves,  Canadian lynx, muskox, snowshoe hare, mountain goats, walrus and caribou. Life zones in Alaska range from grasslands, mountains, tundra to thick forests, which leads to a huge diversity in terrain and geology throughout the state.

Alaska has also over 430 species of birds and the largest population of bald eagles in the nation. From pygmy shrews that weigh less than a penny to gray whales that weigh 45 tons, Alaska is the "Last Frontier" for animals as well as people. Many species endangered elsewhere are still abundant in Alaska.

Aleutian Islands 

The Aleutian Islands are home to an abundance of large bird colonies; more than 240 bird species inhabit in Alaska's Aleutian Archipelago. Large seabird colonies are present on islands like Buldir Island, which has 21 breeding seabird species, including the Bering Sea-endemic red-legged kittiwake. Large seabird colonies are also present on Kiska Island, Gareloi Island, Semisopochnoi Island, Bogoslof Island, and several others.

The islands are also frequented by vagrant Asiatic birds, including the common rosefinch, Siberian rubythroat, bluethroat, lanceolated warbler, and the first North American record of the intermediate egret. Other animals in the Aleutian Chain include the Arctic fox, American mink, Porcupine caribou, northern sea otter, horned puffin, tufted puffin, Steller sea lion, spotted seal, ringed seal, northern fur seal and many more.

Territories

American Samoa 

Because of its remote location, diversity among the terrestrial species is low. The archipelago has a huge variety in animals and more than 9,000 acres is a national park: National Park of American Samoa. The park stretches over three of the six islands in the archipelago: Tutuila, Ofu-Olosega and Ta‘ū. Eight mammal species have been recorded at American Samoa, of which none of them are critically endangered.

The mammals include several species of native bats, including the Samoa flying fox and insular flying fox. The avifauna includes 65 species of bird where the more unusual distinctive ones are the blue-crowned lorikeet, the spotless crake, the many-colored fruit dove, the wattled honeyeater, tropical pigeons, the samoan starling, white tern, black noddy and the red-tailed tropicbird.

There are many reptiles in the islands, including five species of geckos, eight species of skinks and two species of snakes: the Pacific boa and the Australoasian blindsnake. The marine life is magnificent and much concentrated around the colorful coral reefs. The Samoan ocean is a home to sea turtles as hawksbill sea turtle, olive ridley sea turtle, leatherback sea turtle and the green sea turtle. Five species of dolphins live in the area: spinner dolphin, rough-toothed dolphin, bottlenose dolphin, pantropical spotted dolphin and striped dolphin.

Guam 

Shortly after World War II, the brown tree snake was introduced to the island of Guam and caused much of the endemic wildlife to become extinct. Due to an abundance of prey species and lack of predators, the brown tree snake's population exploded and reached nearly 13,000 snakes per square mile at most. Ten out of twelve endemic bird species, ten lizards and two bats all became extinct as a result of the introduction of the brown tree snake. In recent years, a lot has been done by the U.S. government to decrease the number of brown tree snakes on the island. For instance in 2013, a $1 million program by the U.S. Fish and Wildlife Service dropped more than 2000 mice filled with poison on the island. In 2013, more than two million brown tree snakes were estimated to be on the island. Other introduced species include the Philippine deer,  the Asiatic water buffalo, the marine toad and the giant African land snail. Several native species of skinks, geckos and a monitor lizard are still found on the island.

Northern Mariana Islands 

The Commonwealth of Northern Mariana Islands is home to 40 indigenous and introduced bird species. Some endemic bird species are the Mariana fruit dove, the Mariana swiftlet, the Rota white-eye, the Tinian monarch, the bridled white-eye and the golden white-eye. Other common, but introduced species, include the collared kingfisher, the rufous fantail, the fairy tern and the uniform swiftlet. The Mariana fruit bat is endemic to both Guam and the Northern Mariana Islands. The sambar deer is the largest mammal and lives on several of the islands. The Mariana monitor, ranging up to 3 feet long, is also present on the island of Rota. The oceans are home to more than a thousand species of marine life, including for instance the coconut crabs, the mahi-mahi, the barracuda, tridacna, marlin and tuna.

Puerto Rico 

Puerto Rico has 349 bird species, 83 mammals, 25 amphibians, 61 reptiles and 677 species of fish. Birds found nowhere else on earth include for instance the Puerto Rican owl, the Puerto Rican woodpecker, the Puerto Rican tody, the green mango, the Puerto Rican emerald, the Puerto Rican lizard cuckoo, the Puerto Rican nightjar and many more. All current endemic 13 land mammals are bats, which includes for instance the greater bulldog bat, the Antillean ghost-faced bat and the Parnell's mustached bat. Extinct native mammals include the plate-toothed giant hutia and the Puerto Rican cave rat. Reptiles unique to Puerto Rico include the Puerto Rican boa, the guanica blindsnake, the Mona Island iguana, the Puerto Rican worm lizard, the Puerto Rican galliwasp and the Nichols’ dwarf gecko. Amphibians native to the island include the Puerto Rican crested toad, the common coqui, the locust coqui, the wrinkled coqui, the forest coqui, the elfin coqui and the bronze coqui. Endemic fish include the Puerto Rican snake eel and the Puerto Rico coralbrotula.

Virgin Islands 

The Virgin Islands National Park covers approximately 60% of the Island of St. John and nearly all of Hassel Island. The national park has more than 140 species of birds, 302 species of fish, 7 species of amphibians and 22 species of mammals. The tropical Virgin Islands are home to a huge variety of wildlife, including many unique species endemic to the archipelago. There are three species of sea turtles in the USVI that inhabit the local waters and utilize beaches for nesting: the green sea turtle, the hawksbill sea turtle and the leatherback sea turtle. Several species of sharks, manatees and dolphins roam the seas.

Articles by area 

 Fauna of Alabama
 Fauna of Alaska
 Fauna of Arizona
 Fauna of Arkansas
 Fauna of California
 Fauna of Colorado
 Fauna of Connecticut
 Fauna of Delaware
 Fauna of the District of Columbia
 Fauna of Florida
 Fauna of Georgia
 Fauna of Hawaii
 Fauna of Idaho
 Fauna of Illinois
 Fauna of Indiana
 Fauna of Iowa
 Fauna of Kansas
 Fauna of Kentucky
 Fauna of Louisiana
 Fauna of Maine
 Fauna of Maryland
 Fauna of Massachusetts
 Fauna of Michigan
 Fauna of Minnesota
 Fauna of Mississippi
 Fauna of Missouri
 Fauna of Montana
 Fauna of Nebraska
 Fauna of Nevada
 Fauna of New Hampshire
 Fauna of New Jersey
 Fauna of New Mexico
 Fauna of New York
 Fauna of North Carolina
 Fauna of North Dakota
 Fauna of Ohio
 Fauna of Oklahoma
 Fauna of Oregon
 Fauna of Pennsylvania
 Fauna of Rhode Island
 Fauna of South Carolina
 Fauna of South Dakota
 Fauna of Tennessee
 Fauna of Texas
 Fauna of Utah
 Fauna of Vermont
 Fauna of Virginia
 Fauna of Washington
 Fauna of West Virginia
 Fauna of Wisconsin
 Fauna of Wyoming

Insular areas

 Fauna of American Samoa
 Fauna of Guam
 Fauna of the Northern Mariana Islands
 Fauna of Puerto Rico
 Fauna of the United States Virgin Islands

See also 
 Animal welfare in the United States
 Flora of the United States
 Invasive species in the United States

Notes

References